= Aabhoon =

Traditional Sindhi cuisine

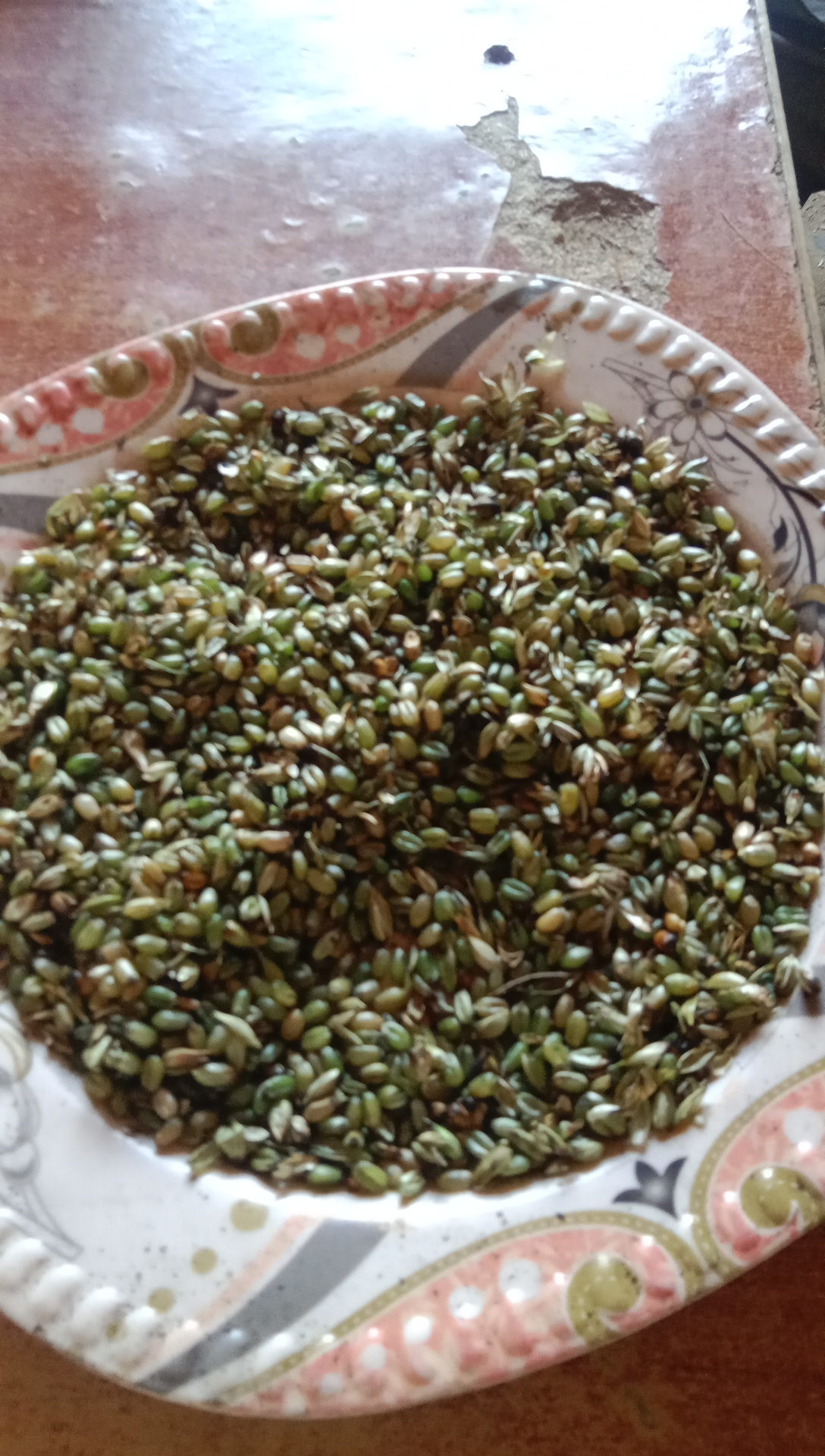
- A bowl of aabhon
- Region or state: Sindh and Punjab
- Main ingredients: Wheat; Millet; Sorghum

Aabhoon (Sindhi: آڀون) is a traditional culinary practice in the regions of Sindh, Punjab, and Balochistan. This ancient method involves roasting green wheat pods over an open fire, a process locally termed "Aabhon." Particularly popular in rural communities, Aabhoon is prepared from semi-ripe grains found in the ears of wheat, millet, and sorghum. The term "Aabhoon" denotes these grains, which, once roasted, are rubbed to remove their husks before consumption. In Sindhi tradition, this delicacy is also referred to as "Khero An," while the spike of millet is specifically known as "Kali."

== History and name ==
The word "Aabhoon" is specifically used in Sindhi and Punjabi cultures and is associated with agricultural traditions. After the sowing of grains, when the spikes begin to form ears, milky unripe grains are produced, which are called "Khero." When these grains start to become half-ripe, they are referred to as "Aabhoon." The spike of millet is particularly known as "Kali."

== Preparation ==
To prepare Aabhoon, the unripe grains are taken from the spikes of wheat, sorghum, or millet. The grains are roasted over a fire or cooked, after which they are rubbed to separate the husks.
